Indigenous peoples in Uruguay or Native Uruguayans, are the peoples who lived in the modern state of Uruguay. Because of colonial practices, disease and active exclusion, only a very small share of the population is aware or knows of indigenous ancestry.

Scholars do not agree about the first settlers in what is now Uruguay; but there is evidence that there was human presence some 10,000 years BCE. Indigenous Uruguayans disappeared in the 1830s and with the exception of the Guaraní, little is known about these peoples and even less about their genetic characteristics. The Charrúa peoples were perhaps the most-talked-about indigenous people of the Southern Cone in what was known as the Banda Oriental. Other significant tribes were the Minuane, Yaro, Güenoa, Chaná, Bohán, Arachán. Languages once spoken in the area include Charrúa, Chaná, Güenoa, Guaraní.

A 2005 genetic study showed 38% of Uruguayans had some indigenous ancestry. According to the 2011 Census, 2.4% of the population reported having indigenous ancestry. A 2009 DNA study in the American Journal of Human Biology showed the average genetic composition in Uruguay is 78.5% European, 11% African and 10.5% Native American.

History 
During pre-colonial times Uruguayan territory was inhabited by small tribes of nomadic Charrua, Chana, Arachan and Guarani peoples. They were a semi-nomadic people who survived by hunting, fishing and gathering and probably never reached more than 10,000 – 20,000 people. It is estimated that there were about 9,000 Charrúa and 6,000 Chaná and Guaraní at the time of contact with the Spanish in the 1500s. By the time of independence, some 300 years later, there were only about 500 native peoples remaining in Uruguay. The cause of the decline in native populations was disease, as well as intermarriage. With little immunity to these diseases, native peoples and culture were gradually diminished.

Native peoples had almost disappeared by the time of Independence as a result of European diseases and constant warfare. European genocide culminated on April 11, 1831 with the Massacre of Salsipuedes, where most of the Charrua men were killed by the Uruguayan army on the orders of President Fructuoso Rivera, and the remaining 300 Charrua women and children were divided as household slaves and servants among Europeans. By 1840 there were only 18 surviving Charrua in Uruguay. According to the history professor and journalist Lincoln Maiztegui Casas, “the disappearance of the Charrúa people was a gradual process that took more than 200 years, and the root cause was territorial occupation by Europeans”.

Significant peoples

Charrúa

Guarani

Guenoa

See also 
Localidad Rupestre de Chamangá
Uruguayan people
Indigenous peoples in South America
Hombre del Catalanense

References

External links
  

 
Uruguay
Ethnic groups in Uruguay